Elbow Room: The Varieties of Free Will Worth Wanting is a 1984 book by the American philosopher Daniel Dennett, in which Dennett discusses the philosophical issues of free will and determinism.

In 1983, Dennett delivered the John Locke Lectures at Oxford on the topic of free will. In 1984, these ideas were published in the book Elbow Room: The Varieties of Free Will Worth Wanting. In this book Daniel Dennett explored what it means for people to have free will. The title, Elbow Room, is a reference to the question: "Are we deterministic machines with no real freedom of action or do we in fact have some elbow room, some real choice in our behavior?".

Synopsis

Determinism doesn't make humans equivalent to animals
A major task taken on by Dennett in Elbow Room is to clearly describe just what people are as biological entities and why they find the issue of free will to be of significance. In discussing what people are and why free will matters to them, Dennett makes use of an evolutionary perspective. Dennett describes the mechanical behavior of the digger wasp Sphex. This insect follows a series of genetically programmed steps in preparing for egg laying. If an experimenter interrupts one of these steps the wasp will repeat that step again. For an animal like a wasp, this process of repeating the same behavior can go on indefinitely, the wasp never seeming to notice what is going on. This is the type of mindless, pre-determined behavior that humans can avoid. Given the chance to repeat some futile behavior endlessly, people can notice the futility of it, and by an act of free will do something else. We can take this as an operational definition of what people mean by free will. Dennett points out the fact that as long as people see themselves as able to avoid futility, most people have seen enough of the free will issue. Dennett then invites all who are satisfied with this level of analysis to get on with living while he proceeds into the deeper hair-splitting aspects of the free will issue.

From a biological perspective, what is the difference between the wasp and a person? The person can, through interaction with his or her environment, construct an internal mental model of the situation and figure out a successful behavioral strategy. The wasp, with a much smaller brain and different genetic program, does not learn from its environment and instead is trapped in an endless and futile behavioral loop that is strictly determined by its genetic program. It is in this sense of people as animals with complex brains that can model reality and appear to choose among several possible behaviors that Dennett says we have free will.

Both determinism and indeterminism seem to rule out free will
The deeper philosophical issue of free will can be framed as a paradox. On one hand, we all feel like we have free will, a multitude of behavioral choices to select among. On the other hand, modern biology generally investigates humans as though the processes at work in them follow the same biological principles as those in wasps. How do we reconcile our feeling of free will with the idea that we might be mechanical components of a mechanical universe?

What about determinism? When we say that a person chooses among several possible behaviors is there really a choice or does it just seem like there is a choice? Do people just (through the action of their more complex brains) simply have better behaviors than wasps, while still being totally mechanical in executing those behaviors? Dennett gives his definition of determinism on page one: All physical events are caused or determined by the sum total of all previous events. This definition dodges a question that many people feel should not be dodged: if we repeatedly replayed the universe from the same point in time would it always reach the same future? Since we have no way of performing this experiment, this question is a long-term classic in philosophy and physicists have tried to interpret the results of other experiments in various ways in order to figure out the answer to this question. Modern day physics-oriented philosophers have sometimes tried to answer the question of free will using the many-worlds interpretation, according to which every time there is quantum indeterminacy each possibility occurs and new universes branch off. Since the 1920s, physicists have been trying to convince themselves that quantum indeterminacy can in some way explain free will. Dennett suggests that this idea is silly. How, he asks, can random resolutions of quantum-level events provide people with any control over their behavior?

Indeterminism is not a solution to the free will problem
Since Dennett wrote Elbow Room (1984) there has been an ongoing attempt by some scientists to answer this question by suggesting that the brain is a device for controlling quantum indeterminacy so as to construct behavioral choice. Dennett argues that such efforts to salvage free will by finding a way out of the prison of determinism are wasted.

Control is the kind of freedom "worth wanting"
Dennett discusses many types of free will (1984). Many philosophers have claimed that determinism and free will are incompatible. What the physicists seem to be trying to construct is a type of free will that involves a way for brains to make use of quantum indeterminacy so as to make choices that alter the universe in our favor, or if there are multiple universes, to choose among the possible universes. Dennett suggests that we can have another kind of free will, a type of free will which we can be perfectly happy with even if it does not give us the power to act in more than one way at any given time. Dennett is able to accept determinism and free will at the same time. How so?

We have free will
The type of free will that Dennett thinks we have is finally stated clearly in the last chapter of the book: the power to be active agents, biological devices that respond to our environment with rational, desirable courses of action. Dennett has slowly, through the course of the book, stripped the idea of behavioral choice from his idea of free will. How can we have free will if we do not have indeterministic choice? Dennett emphasizes control over libertarian choice. If our hypothetically mechanical brains are in control of our behavior and our brains produce good behaviors for us, then do we really need such choice? Is an illusion of behavioral choices just as good as actual choices? Is our sensation of having the freedom to execute more than one behavior at a given time really just an illusion?  Dennett argues that choice exists in a general sense: that because we base our decisions on context, we limit our options as the situation becomes more specific.  In the most specific circumstance (actual events), he suggests there is only one option left to us.

"It is this contrast between the stable and the chaotic that grounds our division of the world into the enduring and salient features of the world, and those features that we must treat statistically or probabilistically. And this division of the world is not just our division; it is, for instance, mother nature's division as well. Since for all mother nature knows (or could know) it is possible that these insects will cross paths (sometime, somewhere) with insectivorous birds, they had better be designed with some avoidance machinery. This endows them with a certain power that will serve well (in general)."

Determinism does not rule out moral responsibility
If people are determined to act as they do, then what about personal responsibility? How can we hold people responsible and punish them for their behaviors if they have no choice in how they behave? Dennett gives a two-part answer to this question:

First, we hold people responsible for their actions because we know from historical experience that this is an effective means to make people behave in a socially acceptable way. Second, holding people responsible only works when combined with the fact that people can be informed of the fact that they are being held responsible and respond to this state of affairs by controlling their behavior so as to avoid punishment. People who break the rules set by society and get punished may be behaving in the only way they can, but if we did not hold them accountable for their actions, people would behave even worse than they do with the threat of punishment. This is a totally utilitarian approach to the issue of responsibility. Expressing moral indignation when people break the rules of proper behaviour is only useful to the extent that it contributes to dissuading such behaviour. Again, an argument from utility. Is it, then, moral to punish people who are unable to do other than break a rule? Yes, people have the right to come together and improve their condition by creating rules and enforcing them. We would be worse off if we did not do so. Again, an argument from utility.

Fatalism is destructive
One final issue: if people do not have real behavioral choices, why not collapse into fatalism? Again, Dennett's argument is that we may not have behavioral choice, but we do have control of our behavior. Dennett asks us to look around at the universe and ask, can I even conceive of beings whose will is freer than our own? For Dennett, the answer to this question is, no, not really. In Elbow Room, he tries to explain why all the attempts that people have made to prove that people have libertarian choice have failed and are, in the final analysis, not really important anyhow. As humans, we are as much in control of our behavior as anything in the universe. As humans, we have the best chance to produce good behavior. We should be satisfied with what we have and not fret over our lack of libertarian free will.

Some complaints about Elbow Room relate to our intuitions about free will. Some say that Dennett's theory does not satisfactorily deal with the issue of why we feel so strongly that we do have behavioral choice. One answer to this question is the result of selection on individuals to live harmoniously in society. But one doesn't have to be free to achieve that goal. Another answer is that it tells us (our brains) whether we're doing something or someone else is doing something to us (e.g. shaking arm). But, again one does not have to be free to make such a distinction. A final answer to this question is that our sensation of having behavioral choice has been carefully selected by evolution. The well-developed human sensation of having free will and being able to select among possible behaviors has strong survival value. People who lose the feeling that they can plan alternative behaviors and execute their choice of possible behaviors tend to become fatalistic and stop struggling for survival. According to Dennett, belief in free will is a necessary condition for having free will. When we are planning for the future and thinking about possible actions to take in the future, we are utilizing considerable amounts of biologically expensive resources (brain power). Evolution has designed us to feel strongly that all of our effort of planning pays off, that we control what we do. If this connection between our brains' efforts to model reality and predict the future and so make possible good outcomes is disconnected from our sense of self and our will, then fatalism and self-destructive behaviors are close at hand. However, the same effect is attainted if, despite not believing in the control free will gives, we believe that does not prevent us to live as fully as our bodies allow us to and to try harder to achieve things if we think we have agency. In other words, we do not need to have the feeling of free will to accomplish our full selves. Nor does it explain the reason we experience we are not acting freely in survival-related actions but we experience free will in other sets of non-survival situations.

References

 Dennett, Daniel, Elbow Room: The Varieties of Free Will Worth Wanting, 1984

1984 non-fiction books
Analytic philosophy literature
Books by Daniel Dennett
Cognitive science literature
English-language books
Free will
Metaphysics books
MIT Press books